David Marchant may refer to:

 David Marchant (businessman), Australian executive in the transport industry
 David Marchant (journalist), publisher and editor of OffshoreAlert
 David R. Marchant, glaciologist